Francisco González Metilli (born 29 March 1997) is an Argentine professional footballer who plays as an attacking midfielder for Central Córdoba SdE, on loan from Argentinos Juniors.

Career
González Metilli's career began with Santamarina. He made his professional debut on 14 March 2016 during a defeat to Nueva Chicago, being substituted on for Gonzalo Ludueña after sixty-three minutes. His first start arrived in the following May against Independiente Rivadavia, though it lasted just nineteen minutes as he was sent off in the first half following two yellow cards in as many minutes. October 2017 saw González Metilli score his first goal against Atlético de Rafaela, prior to netting a brace over Instituto twelve months later. In January 2019, Argentinos Juniors of the Primera División signed González Metilli.

He made his Primera División and Argentinos debut on 28 January 2019, featuring for fifty minutes of a 2–0 loss to Colón. In July 2019, González Metilli was loaned to Primera B Nacional's Estudiantes until June 2020. He scored on his debut against Mitre on 16 August, which preceded a further six goals across twenty-four total appearances for the club. In July 2020, the loan was extended until 31 December.

Career statistics
.

References

External links

1997 births
Living people
People from Tandil
Argentine footballers
Association football midfielders
Primera Nacional players
Argentine Primera División players
Club y Biblioteca Ramón Santamarina footballers
Argentinos Juniors footballers
Estudiantes de Buenos Aires footballers
Club Atlético Tigre footballers
Central Córdoba de Santiago del Estero footballers
Sportspeople from Buenos Aires Province